Farewell Waltz may refer to:
Waltz in A-flat major, Op. 69, No. 1 (Chopin), also called the "Farewell Waltz"
 The Farewell Waltz (1928 film), a 1928 French film by Henry Roussel
Farewell Waltz (film), 1934 German film distributed in U.S. 1939 by Columbia Pictures
"Farewell Waltz in G major", an 1831 piano work by Mikhail Glinka
"Farewell Waltz", a work by Charles Nolcini (1802-1844) 
"Farewell Waltz", a song from Waterloo Bridge (1940 film)
"Farewell Waltz", a solo piano composition by Alexander Peskanov
The Farewell Waltz, a 1972 Czech-language novel by Milan Kundera